Iain Grandage is an Australian composer and music director, best known for his compositions for theatre, dance and concert.  In May 2018, the Perth Festival appointed Grandage as Artistic Director.

Early life
Grandage initially lived in Brisbane, before moving to Perth when he was seven. Grandage studied at the UWA School of Music (now the UWA Conservatorium of Music) as a cellist, and also studied composition with Roger Smalley.

Awards and honours
He has received the Helpmann Award for Best Original Score multiple times, for play Cloudstreet in 2002, play The Secret River in 2013, dance work When Time Stops in 2014, opera The Rabbits (with Kate Miller-Heidke) in 2015, and concert work Satan Jawa (with Rahayu Supanggah) in 2017.

Grandage received the Sidney Myer Performing Arts Award for an individual in 2012.

References

Australian composers
Living people
Year of birth missing (living people)
Helpmann Award winners
Musicians from Brisbane
Australian male composers
20th-century Australian male musicians
20th-century Australian musicians
20th-century composers
21st-century Australian male musicians
21st-century Australian musicians
21st-century composers
Place of birth missing (living people)